The 1955–56 Michigan Wolverines men's basketball team represented the University of Michigan in intercollegiate basketball during the 1955–56 season.  The team finished the season in a tie for eighth place in the Big Ten Conference with an overall record of 9–13 and 4–10 against conference opponents.

William Perigo was in his fourth year as the team's head coach. Junior Ron Kramer was the team's leading scorer with 448 points in 22 games for an average of 20.3 points per game.  Tom Jorgensen was the team captain.

Statistical leaders

Team players drafted into the NBA
Two players from this team were selected in the NBA Draft.

References

Michigan
Michigan Wolverines men's basketball seasons
Michigan Wolverines basketball
Michigan Wolverines basketball